The 1974–75 Hong Kong First Division League season was the 64th since its establishment.

League table

References
1974–75 Hong Kong First Division table (RSSSF)

Hong
Hong Kong First Division League seasons
football